Pancha Gauda is one of the two major groupings of Brahmins in Hinduism, of which the other is Pancha-Dravida.

In Rajatarangini 
According to Kalhana's Rajatarangini (c. 12th century CE), the Pancha Gauda group includes the following five Brahmin communities, which according to the text, reside to the north of the Vindhyas:

 Saraswata
 Kanyakubja
 Gauda
 Utkala
 Maithila

The Sahyadrikhanda, considered a part of the Skanda Purana, also mentions the above classification.

In the kaifiyats 
The Maratha-era kaifiyats (bureaucratic records) of Deccan, which give an account of the society in the southern Maratha country, mention the following Brahmin communities as Pancha-Gaudas

 Kanoji Brahmins
 Kamrupi Brahmins
 Utkala Brahmins
 Maithil Brahmins
 Gurjara Brahmins

According to the kaifiyats, the Pancha Gaudas could be either Smarta, Vaishnavas or Bhagavats.

References

Brahmin communities
Indian castes